The 1972 Drexel Dragons football team was an American football team that represented Drexel University during as an independent during the 1972 NCAA College Division football season. In their fourth year under head coach Sterling Brown, the team compiled an overall record of 3–6.

Schedule

References

Drexel
Drexel Dragons football seasons
Drexel Dragons football